Zanthoxylum bungeanum  is a species of plant in the family Rutaceae. It is one of the sources of the spice Sichuan pepper. The plant is native to North-Central China, South-Central China, Southeast China, East Himalayas, Inner Mongolia, Manchuria, Nepal, Qinghai, Tibet, Xinjiang. It was also introduced in Uzbekistan.

References

bungeanum
Peppers